Harold Nunley (12 January 1912 – June 2005) was an English cricketer.  Nunley was a left-handed batsman who bowled slow left-arm orthodox.  He was born at Raunds, Northamptonshire.

Nunley made three first-class appearances for Northamptonshire in the 1931 County Championship against Glamorgan, Kent and Worcestershire.  In these three matches, he scored a total of just 20 runs at an average of 6.66, with a high score of 12.

He died at Kettering, Northamptonshire in June 2005.

References

External links
Harold Nunley at ESPNcricinfo
Harold Nunley at CricketArchive

1912 births
2005 deaths
People from Raunds
English cricketers
Northamptonshire cricketers